Mentawai Strait separates the island of Sumatra from the small archipelago of the Mentawai Islands, Indonesia.  Its waters belong to the Indian Ocean and both banks are part of the province of West Sumatra.

The strait is about 450 km long and its width varies between 100 and 150 km.  The main city on the edge of the strait is the capital of West Sumatra, Padang.

The strait is in major fault zone and several earthquakes have been located in it, being the most known those of 1833 Sumatra earthquake and that of 2009 Sumatra earthquake.

See also 
Mentawai Islands Regency

References 

Straits of Indonesia
Landforms of West Sumatra
Mentawai Islands Regency
Landforms of Sumatra
Straits of the Indian Ocean